The Odisha Tourism Development Corporation (OTDC) is a Government of Odisha undertaking corporation in the Indian state of Odisha. It was incorporated in the year 1979 to promote tourism in the state and operate some of the existing tourist bungalows and transport fleets in commercial line. OTDC's Tourist Bungalows are called as Panthanivas.

Panthanivas Locations

A live map is hosted on the official site with details of locations

Tours

Packaged Tours
OTDC provides customised tour packages. Seasonal packages are also made available to facilitate travellers coming from other regions for special events like Nabakalebara 2015.

Gallery

References

External links
Official Website of Odisha Tourism Development Corporation (OTDC)
Odisha Tourism Development Corporation (OTDC) Manual
 

1979 establishments in Orissa
Government agencies established in 1979
Tourism in Odisha
State agencies of Odisha
State tourism development corporations of India